Meng Tingyi (Chinese 蒙亭宜) is a Chinese film actress.

Awards
In 2010 Meng won an award for her performance in a short film August 15th, based on a true story about a bus hijacking.

Filmography
 Crimes of Passion (2013)
 Dot 2 Dot (2014)
 Who Is Undercover (2014)
 Royalty in Blood (2015)

References

External links
 

Living people
21st-century Chinese actresses
Chinese film actresses
Year of birth missing (living people)